Paraheterobothrium is a genus of monogeneans within the family Diclidophoridae.

Species 

 Paraheterobothrium chilense 
 Paraheterobothrium exile 
 Paraheterobothrium hippoglossini 
 Paraheterobothrium papillosum 
 Paraheterobothrium syacii

References 

Monogenea genera
Diclidophoridae